Nadine Müller is the name of:

Nadine Müller (politician) (born 1983), German politician
Nadine Müller (athlete) (born 1985), German discus thrower